The Chaperone 3D is a Canadian documentary film, directed by Fraser Munden and released in 2013. Blending several different styles of animation and puppetry, the film reenacts the true story of Ralph Whims and Stefan Czernatowicz, who were once present as a chaperone and DJ at a school dance that was invaded by a biker gang which Whims and Czernatowicz had to personally fight off.

The film premiered at the 2013 Toronto International Film Festival and was the runner up for best short film.

The film was named to TIFF's annual year-end Canada's Top Ten list for 2013, and received a Canadian Screen Award nomination for Best Short Documentary Film at the 3rd Canadian Screen Awards.

References

External links
 

2013 films
2013 short documentary films
2010s animated short films
Canadian short documentary films
Canadian animated short films
Canadian animated documentary films
2010s English-language films
2010s Canadian films